The Departments of Niger are subdivided into communes. As of 2005, in the seven Regions and one Capital Area, there were 36 départements, divided into 265 communes, 122 cantons and 81 groupements.  The latter two categories cover all areas not covered by Urban Communes (population over 10000) or Rural Communes (population under 10000), and are governed by the Department, whereas Communes have (since 1999) elected councils and mayors.  Additional semi-autonomous sub-divisions include Sultanates, Provinces and Tribes (tribus).  The Nigerien government estimates there are an additional 17000 Villages administered by Rural Communes, while there are over 100 Quartiers (boroughs  or neighborhoods) administered by Urban Communes.

The territorial reorganisation of Niger's local administration, known informally as the Decentralisation process, was carried out through a series of laws from 1998 - 2005.  Most important are:
 The Constitution of 9 August 1999 ;
 Law n°98-032 of 14 September, determining the statutes for Communautés Urbaines ;
 Law n°2001-023 of 10 August 2001, creating the administrative boundaries and Territorial Collectivities;
 Law n° 2002-017 of 11 June 2002, determining the independent administration of Regions, Departments, and Communes, as well as their obligations and resources;
 Law n° 2002-014 of 11 June 2002, for the creation of the Communes and the fixing of their boundaries and seats (chefs-lieux).

While often translated as "town", Nigerien communes are simply the third level administrative subdivision of the nation. These can be classified Urban or Rural communes, and while often identical in territory to the administrative unit of a town or city, all areas of the country fall within a commune. The communes are listed below, by Department.

Aguie Department
Aguié
Tchadoua

Arlit Department
 Arlit
 Gougaram
 Iferouane
 Timia

Bilma Department
Bilma

Bkonni Department

Boboye Department
Harikanassou
Koygolo
Birni n'gaoure

Bouza Department

Dakoro Department
Azaghor
Bader Goula
Bermo
Dakoro
Dan Goulbi
Gababedji
Kornaka
Roumbou
Sabon Machi
Tagriss

Diffa Department
Diffa
Bosso

Dogondoutchi Department
Dogondoutchi
Matankari
Kiéché
Dan Kassari
Dogon Kiria
Soucoucoutane
Koré Maïroua
Tibiri
Doumega
Guéchémé

Dosso Department

Filingue Department
Kourfey
 Imanan
Tondikondia

Gaya Department

Goure Department

Groumdji Department

Illela Department
Badaguichiri
Illéla

Keita Department

Kollo Department
 Kollo
N'Dounga
Bitinkodji
Fakara
Hamdallay
 Karma
Kirtachi
Kouré
Liboré
Namaro

Loga Department

Madarounfa Department

Madaoua Department

Maine-soroa Department

Magaria Department

Maradi Department
 Communauté Urbaine de Maradi
 Commune de Maradi I
 Commune de Maradi II
 Commune de Maradi III

Matameye Department

Mayahi Department

Mirriah Department
Kolleram

N'guigmi Department

Niamey
Communauté Urbaine de Niamey (CUN) includes five Urban Communes and 99 Quarters, each with elected representatives (délégués de commune) to the Council of the Communauté Urbaine de Niamey.
 Commune de Niamey I : 20 quarters ;
 Commune de Niamey II : 17 quarters ;
 Commune de Niamey III : 17 quarters ;
 Commune de Niamey IV : 17 quarters ;
 Commune de Niamey V : 28 quarters .

Ouallam Department

Say Department
 Say
Ouro Gueladjo
Tamou
Torodi

Tahoua Department
 Affala
Bambaye
 Barmou
 Kalfou
 Communauté Urbaine de Tahoua
 Commune de Tahoua I
 Commune de Tahoua II

Tanout Department
Six communes:
 Gangara
Falanko
Ollelewa
Tanout
 Tarka
Tenhya

Tchin-Tabaraden Department

Tchirozerine Department
 Dabaga
 Tchirozerine
 Agadez

Téra Department
 Téra
 Gorouol
 Kokorou
 Dargol
 Diagourou

Tessaoua Department

Tillaberi Department
 Tillabéri
 Anzourou
 Ayorou
 Dessa
 Kourteye
 Sinder

Zinder Department
 Communauté Urbaine de Zinder
 Commune de Zinder I
 Commune de Zinder II
 Commune de Zinder III
 Commune de Zinder IV

See also
 Departments of Niger
 Regions of Niger

References

 
Subdivisions of Niger
Niger, Communes
Niger 3
Communes, Niger
Niger geography-related lists